The 1998 Calgary municipal election was held on October 19, 1998 to elect a Mayor and 14 Aldermen to Calgary City Council.

In addition to the city council election, trustees to the Calgary Board of Education, Calgary Catholic School District, two plebiscites and the Alberta Senate nominee election.

Incumbent Mayor Al Duerr was re-elected defeating Alderman Ray Clark, and each incumbent Alderman was re-elected.

Background
Calgary City Council approved a vote on a question on whether Calgarians continued to support water fluoridation following the 1989 plebiscite which saw fluoride first introduced. Plebiscites had previously failed to garner sufficient support in 1957, 1961 1966, and 1971. The Calgary Regional Health Authority promoted the fluoridation campaign, spending $250,000 on advertising and other measures. Opponents proposed to take legal action when pro-fluoride posters were on display at a voting station on election day which anti-fluoride groups charged was illegal.

The second vote on a question put to Calgary voters was whether video lottery terminals (VLTs) should be removed by the provincial government, or whether the decision to remove VLTs from Calgary should remain with City Council. The plebiscite was held in 28 municipalities across Alberta after the provincial government increased access to VLTs, increasing the number present in the province from 500 in 1997 to 2,200 in 1998.  Prominent Calgary oilman Jim Gray was an advocate for the removal of the VLTs, while casinos and restaurant groups advocated for VLTs to remain. Incumbent Mayor Duerr supported the provincial government removing the VLTs while the main challenger Clark supported keeping VLTs in the city and leaving the decision to council.

A police investigation followed a bomb threat to incumbent Ward 13 alderman Sue Higgins written on a ballot cast during the election.

Results
Election results from Calgary Herald.

Mayor

Ward 1

Ward 2

Ward 3

Ward 4

Ward 5

Ward 6

Ward 7

Ward 8

Ward 9

Ward 10

Ward 11

Ward 12

Ward 13

Ward 14

Plebiscites

Fluoridation
Calgarians were asked "Are you in favour of continuing the fluoridation of the municipal water supply? YES or NO."

VLTs
Calgarians were asked "Should The City of Calgary request that the Provincial Government take appropriate action to remove all video lottery terminals from our city? YES or No."

See also
List of Calgary municipal elections

References

Further reading

1998
October 1998 events in Canada
1990s in Calgary